The Chest of Saint Simeon or Saint Simeon's Casket is a rectangular cedarwood sarcophagus in the shape of a chasse, overlaid with silver and silver-gilt plaques, said to hold the relics of St Simon the God-receiver; it is located over the main altar in the Church of Saint Simeon in Zadar, Croatia. The chest, considered a masterpiece of medieval art and also a unique monument of the goldsmith's craft of the age, is one of the most interesting works in gold in Europe now under the protection of UNESCO. It was made by local goldsmiths to an Italian design between 1377 and 1380.

The cult of St. Simeon, the story of how the queen stole the finger of Zadar's patron saint, or gonfaloniero as the locals call it, and the donation of a magnificent shrine to atone for the stealing of the saint's finger illustrate not only the political aspect orchestrated by the Angevins amid the people's belief in the authenticity of Zadar's body over the one kept in Venice, but also the high level of development and quality in goldsmithing during the second half of the fourteenth century.

The top of the chest containing the mummified body of the silver-crowned bearded saint enclosed behind a sheet of transparent glass is elevated above the main altar and displayed to the public, as well as its interior full of precious gifts given by Elizabeth of Bosnia, every year on 8 October, at 8:30 a.m.

History

The legend of the chest
Eastern Roman emperors who were seated in Constantinople in the sixth century were not only expanding their collection of valuable works of art, but also relics of saints in order to be able to stand side by side with Rome's. So, between 565 and 568 AD the sarcophagus where the remains of St. Simeon were being kept was moved from Syria to Constantinople, where it stayed until the year 1203 when it was then shipped to Venice.

According to tradition, the veneration of St. Simeon at Zadar began after the arrival of a Venetian merchant there who was transporting the relics of the saint in a stone sarcophagus when his ship was caught in a storm off Zadar, on the Dalmatian coast. While the city repaired his ship, he secretly buried the sarcophagus in a cemetery nearby so as to keep it safe from any danger; soon after that he got very ill. He sought refuge at an inn at the head of Zadar's harbour, where monks began to treat him. Seeing that his medical condition had worsened, they took all of his documents and found an inscription hanging around his neck reporting the miraculous powers of the saint. Oddly enough, that same night, three rectors appeared to them in a dream and warned each one individually that the remains of the holy saint were really buried in that said cemetery. Early in the following morning, as they walked to the site where they expected to find that stone sarcophagus, they told one another about their vision and so realised that they all had shared the same dream. They got to the grave where the chest had been hidden and dug it out of the ground, unaware of the real powers of its content. Shortly after that, gossips about this story reported by the monks and miracles performed in the name of the saint began to spread around the region inciting to the locals to refuse to let his body leave Zadar.

When the remains of St. Simeon first came to Zadar they were deposed in the cemetery of a suburban monastery (Church of the Virgin - Velika Gospa), which later became associated with the city's pilgrims hospice, until they were transferred to the sacristy of the female monastery of St. Mary Major, where they remained until its demolition to make room for the construction of the city walls in 1570. On 16 May 1632 they were transferred once more amid public rejoicing to a church consecrated to St. Stephen, the Martyr, and which subsequently came to be known as the Sanctuary of Saint Simeon the Righteous, the prophet of the Nunc Dimittis. Since then St. Simeon, one of the four patrons of Zadar, has been revered in the city.

The theft of the finger
In 1371, Elizabeth of Bosnia, daughter of Stephen II, Ban of Bosnia, and Queen of Hungary and Croatia as wife of one of the most powerful European rulers of his time, King Louis I, visited the city of Zadar. According to legend, during a religious mass, she furtively cracked off a piece of St. Simeon's finger and hid it in the breast of her dress, where it immediately began to decompose, a process which miraculously reverted itself when she returned the piece to the saint's hand. Confused by the appearing wound on her bosom and without being able to continue up to the point where she could safely exit from the church, most probably because of the maggots that infested the broken piece, she ran blindly through the aisle of the church only to find out that she would soon be morally forced to restore the piece back to its original place under the accusatory and inquisitive glances exchanged by the many noblemen who formed a circle around her.

When Elizabeth finally left the church she promised to honour the saint by presenting the church with a gift ornated in gold that she later came to commission to the Milanese goldsmith Francesco di Antonio da Sesto (Francis of Milan), who was asked to create a paper model with drawings of all the details to be discussed and approved by the queen's representatives so that their legibility and presentation might be in accordance with the royal expectations and deep interest in the making of such precious shrine. The intricate carvings were dexterously executed between 1377 and 1380 and was assisted by Andrija Markov from Zagreb, Petar Blažev from Reča, Stejpan Pribičev and Mihovil Damjanov.

Recent events
In 2007 the Archbishop of Zadar and the Greek Orthodox Patriarch of Jerusalem agreed that the Archdiocese would provide a piece of the body of the saint to the Patriarchate of Jerusalem to be venerated in the Church of the Katamon Monastery of St. Simeon. Arrangements were made with the Congregation of Divine Worship and Cult of Saints in Rome and the small silver reliquary, constraining a particle measuring 5 x 2.5 cm and bearing the Latin inscription: "Ex corporis Sancti Simeoni Iusti Zadar 7. octobris 2010", was solemnly handed over to the representatives of the Orthodox Church during the celebration of Vespers in the eastern part of the historic quarters of Zadar.

Description of the chest

Dimensions
The rectangular silver chest of Saint Simeon, standing 2.3 m above the ground on the main altar of the church of the same name, measures 1.92 m long by 62.5 cm wide and, including the 56 cm high saddle-shaped lid, 1.27 m high. The front side of the lid is dominated by the carved reclining figure of the saint dressed in a gown and cloak richly ornamented with plant motifs made by punching fastened on his breast by a clasp. The front panel, which unfolds by means of hinges located on the bottom displaying the saint's laid-down figure, measures 66.5 cm high. It is raised by the outstretched arms of four bronze angels forged from seventeenth century Turkish cannons that were seized in the waters of Zadar in 1648. Covered inside and outside with a thin lamina of 240 kg of pure silver and also a considerable quantity of gold, it shows intricate details carved on the cedar wood used to give shape to the chest. All free surface of the chest is filled in with more or less standard vine, leaves and winding rosettes of sinuate leaves ornamentations decorated with gold.

Relief compositions
The front part of the chest displays enhanced relief compositions depicting scenes from the saint's early years as a preacher, death and ascension into heaven on the back of a virgin, as well as biblical and historical events of his time. The inside part contains a relief made by goldsmith Stjepan Martinič of Zadar representing the patron saints of the city in the background. The inside of the lid is magnificently illustrated with three miracles attributed to the saint. His holy monk-like figure and two sets of the arms of Anjou also appear in high relief on both the triangle areas of the lid. They are both richly decorated in the same manner together with the shield of Hungarian bars and the characteristic Angevin fleur-de-lis, a cloak and a helmet with a crown. Above the crowns rises an ostrich with outspread wings and a horseshoe in its beak. Around the coat of arms there are reliefs of acanthus leaves, and beside them the initials of the king: L.R. (Latin: Lodovicus Rex).

The Latin inscription on the central panel on the back of the chest, which corresponds to the main composition on the front panel, bears the goldsmith's signature with Louis's coat of arms in the corners of the richly worked vine tracery that complements the relief. It is divided in two parts, being the larger with the main inscription in Gothic capital letters beaten in high relief: "SYMEON: HI.C.IVSTVS.YEXVM.DE.VIRGINE.NATVM.VLNIS: QVI.TENVITHAC.ARCHA. PACE.QVIESCIT.HVNGARIE.REGINA.POTENS: ILLVSTRIS: ED.ALTA: ELYZABET.IUNIOR:QVAM.VOTO:CONTVLIT. ALMO.ANNO.MILLENO: TRECENO: OCTVAGENO." Below, angraved in stylized minuscule letters, appears the goldsmith's signature: "hoc.opus.fecit: franciscus.d.mediolano."

Known in medieval Latin hexameters, the translation of the inscription reads as follows: "Simeon the Righteous, holding Jesus, born of a virgin, in his arms, rests in peace in this chest, commissioned by the Queen of Hungary, mighty, glorious and majestic Elizabeth the Younger, in the year 1380. This is the work of Francis of Milan".

Main scenes
The scenes are separated by columns surmounted by small heads of angels sculpted during the two-year restoration process started in 1630. The work was conducted by the goldsmiths Constantino Piazzalonga of Venice and Benedetto Libani of Zadar, who reduced the length of the chest by four and the width by three fingers.

Note: The visual narrative of The Theft of the Finger and two other scenes located on the back part of the chest have recently been considered to be all connected. Such conclusion may differ from another line of thoughts who point to a longer narrative based on a chronological sequence of events, which begins with the scene The Boat in the Storm, shifts from visual to written discourse in the reading of the Latin inscription on the back panel, and ends in the complementary scene The Death of Ban Kotromanić.

Gallery

See also
Capetian House of Anjou
House of Kotromanić
Treaty of Zadar

Notes

References

Sources
Radovinovič, Radovan (1998). The Croatian Adriatic, Naklada Naprijed, pp. 169–170. 
Kokole, S. (2008). The Silver Shrine of Saint Simeon in Zadar: Collecting Ancient Coins and Casts after the Antique in Fifteenth-Century Dalmatia, History of Art Studies. 
Bak, J.M. (1986). Roles and Functions of Queens in Arpadian and Angevin Hungary (1000-1386 A.D.), Medieval Queenship (ed) New York. 
Attribution

This article incorporates information translated from the corresponding article of the Croatian Wikipedia. A list of contributors can be found there at the History section.

Further reading
Fondra, Lorenzo (1855).  Istoria della insigne reliquia di San Simeone profeta che si venera in Zara, Zara : Frat. Battava,  
Madden, Thomas F. (2008). The Fourth Crusade: Event, Aftermath, and Perceptions (Crusades - Subsidia) - The Translatio Symonensis and the Seven Thieves: A Venetian Fourth Crusade furta sacra Narrative and the Looting of Constantinople by David M. Perry, Society for the Study of the Crusades and the Latin East. Conference. Ashgate.

External links

Crown found in the shrine of Saint Simeon in Zara on Sigismundus website
The Canticle of Simeon on the Catholic Encyclopedia.

14th-century sculptures
History of Zadar
Sarcophagi
Christian reliquaries
Tourist attractions in Zadar